"Talk to the hand" (or "tell it to the hand") is a slang phrase associated with the 1990s. It originated as a sarcastic way of saying one does not want to hear what the person who is speaking is saying.

It is often elongated to a phrase such as "Talk to the hand, because the ears ain't listening" or "Talk to the hand, because the face ain't listening."

Meaning and usage
Often considered to be sarcastic or obnoxious, the phrase was popularized by actor and comedian Martin Lawrence in his 1992 sitcom Martin. It was formally reported from as early as 1995, when a local Indianapolis magazine story noted "Talk to the hand—The phrase, which means, 'Shut up', is accompanied by a hand in front of the victim's face."

It is usually accompanied by the gesture of extending one arm toward the other person, with the palm of that hand facing the person being insulted, in the manner of the gesture to stop. Use of the phrase was noted to be a passing trend, as one author noted in advising writers against the use of quickly dated slang: "Slang is trendy. Last year every young person I knew was saying 'Talk to the hand'. Now no one even remembers 'Talk to the hand'".

Lynne Truss, noted for writing the bestselling Eats, Shoots & Leaves, used the phrase as the title and prime example in her 2006 book, Talk to the Hand: The Utter Bloody Rudeness of the World Today.

In 2001, British R&B girl group Honeyz released the single "Talk to the Hand", and in 2018 Norwegian pop singer, Aleksander Walmann released a single with the same title as well, taking part in the Norwegian preselection show for the Eurovision Song Contest.

The phrase and the gesture were notably featured in Terminator 3: Rise of the Machines (2003), where they were used by the titular character, played by Arnold Schwarzenegger.

In 2006, French spoof rap group Fatal Bazooka recorded a song called "Parle à ma main" (French for "Talk to my hand") featuring Yelle.

In Mario Strikers Charged, a Birdo does this gesture to Princess Peach whenever she lashes out at her teammates due to the opponent scoring a goal.

See also

 Mountza

Notes

African-American slang
Hand gestures
1990s slang